Interferon-induced transmembrane protein 3 (IFITM3) is a protein that in humans is encoded by the IFITM3 gene.  It plays a critical role in the immune system's defense against Swine Flu, where heightened levels of IFITM3 keep viral levels low, and the removal of IFITM3 allows the virus to multiply unchecked. This observation has been further advanced by a recent study from Paul Kellam's lab that shows that a single nucleotide polymorphism in the human IFITM3 gene purported to increase influenza susceptibility is overrepresented in people hospitalised with pandemic H1N1. The prevalence of this mutation is thought to be approximately 1/400 in European populations.

Model organisms

Model organisms have been used in the study of IFITM3 function. A conditional knockout mouse line, called Ifitm3tm1Masu was generated as part of the International Knockout Mouse Consortium program — a high-throughput mutagenesis project to generate and distribute animal models of disease to interested scientists — at the Wellcome Trust Sanger Institute.

Male and female animals underwent a standardized phenotypic screen to determine the effects of deletion. Twenty four tests were carried out on mutant mice, but no significant abnormalities were observed. However, challenge with influenza A virus indicated that these mice display increased viral susceptibility.

References

Further reading

Genes mutated in mice